Madonna and Child with the Infant (Saint, St.) John the Baptist may refer to:

 Madonna and Child with the Infant Saint John the Baptist, (Leonardo), 1470s
 Madonna and Child with the Infant St. John the Baptist (Bellini, Indianapolis), 1490–1495
 Madonna and Child with the Infant John the Baptist (Perugino),  1497
 Madonna and Child with the Infant John the Baptist (Correggio, Chicago), 1513-1514
 Madonna and Child with the Infant John the Baptist (Correggio, Madrid), 1518
 Madonna and Child with the Infant Saint John the Baptist (Pontormo), c.1530